Barwell is a surname, and may refer to:

 Gavin Barwell (born 1972), British Conservative Party politician
 Henry Barwell (1877–1959), 28th Premier of South Australia
 Len Barwell, New Zealand football player
 Phillip R. Barwell, DFC, Group Captain Officer No. 46 Squadron RAF
 Terry Barwell (born 1937), South African cricketer
 William Barwell (1705–1769), administrator of the English East India Company